Ruan Ludick (born ) is a Namibian rugby union player, currently playing with the Namibia national team and the  in South African domestic rugby. His regular position is lock.

Rugby career

Ludick was born in Pretoria in South Africa, but grew up in Windhoek.

In December 2016, he joined Welsh Premier Division side Merthyr on a two-year deal.

References

External links
 

Namibian rugby union players
Living people
1994 births
Rugby union players from Pretoria
Rugby union locks
Namibia international rugby union players
Welwitschias players